The North Carolina Tar Heels men's lacrosse team represents the University of North Carolina at Chapel Hill in National Collegiate Athletic Association (NCAA) Division I men's lacrosse. North Carolina currently competes as a member of the Atlantic Coast Conference (ACC) and plays its home games at Fetzer Field and Kenan Memorial Stadium in Chapel Hill, North Carolina. Their main rivalry series is with fellow ACC member Duke.

Overview
A club team was established at the school in 1937 but didn't play until 1938. That team played until the start of World War II until another club team was established for the 1944 season.  When lacrosse returned to campus in 1949 it was elevated to varsity status. Carolina rose to national prominence in the late 1970s under Hall of Fame coach and former Johns Hopkins Blue Jay Willie Scroggs. The program's first 1st-team All-American in Division I was defenseman Ralph "Rip" Davy in 1979. Between 1980 and 1996, the UNC lacrosse team qualified for the NCAA tournament 14 of the 16 years. During that span, Carolina also won 11 ACC titles. In 1981, the Tar Heels began a 26-game winning streak, and won the national championship in 1981, 1982 and 1986.

The UNC lacrosse program won its fifth national title in 2016, beating Maryland 14-13 in an overtime thriller.  At 12-6 on the season, UNC entered the NCAA tournament unseeded at 8-6.  They became the first unseeded national champion in the last 45 years.  This is the first title since 1991, when they won their fourth national title, going undefeated on the season at 16-0. Since then, UNC won four of five ACC championship games between 1992 and 1996.

History

1937–1954
The first lacrosse team was formed in 1937 at the club level. At the time, they used old equipment from the football team and competed in the Dixie Lacrosse League against Duke, Virginia, Washington & Lee, Loyola, and the Washington Lacrosse Club. The Tar Heels were the Dixie Lacrosse League champions for 1941.  In 1949, the university conferred varsity status on the team, and in 1950, North Carolina became a member of the United States Intercollegiate Lacrosse Association (USILA). The following season, goalie Nick Sowell became the Tar Heels' first All-American when he was named to the USILA Honorable Mention team.

In 1954, after compiling a combined 14-43-1 record in its first six seasons, the varsity team was disbanded by the administration in order to focus on other sports.

1964–1974
Lacrosse returned as a varsity sport in 1964. In 1974, Paul Doty took over as head coach. That year, the school started awarding scholarships for the sport and was promoted from the small college level (now Division II and Division III) to Division I.

1979–1990
In 1979 William Scroggs became the head coach at North Carolina and led the Tar Heels to six ACC titles, three NCAA championships, and 11 appearances in the NCAA Tournament during a 12-year career. He compiled a record of 120-37 (.764) as the head coach at North Carolina, with NCAA titles in 1981, 1982, and 1986. Scroggs would retire after a loss to Syracuse University in the Semifinals of the NCAA Tournament. From 1986 to 1990, Scroggs coached Joe Breschi, who later became the coach of the UNC Men's Lacrosse team.

1991–2000
In 1991, first-year head coach Dave Klarmann replaced Willie Scroggs and led the Tar Heels through an undefeated regular season. Carolina extended its winning streak throughout the postseason, first winning the ACC tournament, and then defeating Loyola, Syracuse, and Towson in succession to post a perfect 16–0 mark and capture the NCAA national championship. Klarmann's teams repeated as ACC tournament champions in 1992 before advancing to the NCAA Championship semifinal, where they fell to third-seeded Princeton, 16-14. In 1993 and 1994, Carolina again captured the ACC title, but fell to Syracuse in the NCAA Championship 13-12 in 1993 and suffered an early exit in the 1994 NCAA tournament. In the late 1990s, the Tar Heels struggled, alternately, to qualify for or advance in the NCAA tournament.

At the end of the head coach's Dave Klarmann's time at UNC (10 years, one national championship, five ACC tournament championships) there were a series of off-the-field incidences  between 1995 and 1999. One player died of a gunshot wound, another from asphyxiation, another was injured from a stabbing in a night club and a fourth had a serious illness.

2001–2008
John Haus replaced Klarmann as head coach for the 2001 season. John Haus was UNC's head coach from 2001 to 2008. In his fourth year, Carolina advanced to the NCAA quarterfinals before losing to Johns Hopkins, 15–9. They returned to the NCAA tournament and quarterfinals in 2007, where they were defeated by second-seeded Duke, 19–11. In 2008, Carolina was knocked out of the first round by Navy.

2009
In 2009, alumnus Joe Breschi, a former first-team All-American defenseman in 1990 and USA national team member in 1990 and 1994, became head coach at his alma mater, after being a coach at Ohio State University. In Breschi's first season in 2009, North Carolina surprised many observers when the team returned to the NCAA quarterfinals, before losing to rival Duke 12-11. The lackluster performance as head coach from John Haus had brought many questions from fans on if UNC men's lacrosse could recover. Breschi took the challenge, and has completely rebuilt the program, transforming them into a top contender once again. Joe Breschi, Ryan Wade, Marcus Holman, Frank Riggs, Tommy Sears. Joey Sievold, Randy Cox, and Mac Ford are the only UNC players to play for the USA National Team.

2010
In 2010, The Baltimore Sun commented that "it's no longer a question whether Breschi can rebuild North Carolina, but when the Tar Heels will arrive." In his second season, Carolina again advanced to the quarterfinals before losing to Duke, 17–9. That season, North Carolina swept the ACC postseason awards, with Breschi named ACC Coach of the Year, junior attackman Billy Bitter named ACC Player of the Year, and Marcus Holman named ACC Freshman of the Year.

2012
UNC finished the 2012 season with an 11-6 record, in the sixth season in a row UNC had a winning record. UNC lost to Duke in the ACC Tournament final game. UNC received a #8 seed in the 16-team 2012 NCAA tournament. UNC lost in the first round of the NCAA tournament to Denver 14-16. Denver lost in the next round to eventual champion Loyola (Md.). It was the second year in a row UNC lost in the first round of the NCAA tournament.

2013
UNC attained a #1 ranking in the 2013 season and won the ACC tournament. Attackman Marcus Holman was the second player in UNC lacrosse history to be named a finalist for the annual Tewaaraton award given to the best college lacrosse player. Attackman Jed Prosser was UNC's first finalist in 2004.

Season Results
The following is a list of North Carolina's results by season as an NCAA Division I program:

{| class="wikitable"

|- align="center"

†NCAA canceled 2020 collegiate activities due to the COVID-19 virus.
 UNC Lacrosse site

Alumni in the Premier Lacrosse League (8)

Alumni

First Team All-Americans

*Player of the Year

Former players in Major League Lacrosse (MLL)

Major League Lacrosse (MLL) currently has eight teams. The 2013 season starts at the end of April and ends in August. There are four former UNC players who played for MLL teams in the 2012 season. Billy Bitter (attack, UNC '11) and Ryan Flanagan (defenseman, UNC '11) played for the Charlotte Hounds in the 2012 season. Flanagan is currently on the Charlotte Hounds roster for the 2013 season. Ben Hunt (midfielder, UNC '09) and Tim Kaiser (defenseman, UNC '08) play for the Chesapeake Bayhawks.

Only seniors with expiring eligibility are eligible to be drafted by MLL teams in the annual January drafts. After the NCAA season is complete on Memorial Day, the MLL will allow all undrafted seniors who completed their eligibility to register for a player pool, giving MLL teams an opportunity to select the undrafted players for one week. The Ohio Machine selected current senior Marcus Holman in the second round of the last MLL draft.

References

 
1937 establishments in North Carolina
Lacrosse clubs established in 1937